The Ealing Half Marathon is an annual road running event held on the streets of Ealing, United Kingdom, organised by Ealing Half Marathon CIC.

The first event took place in 2012 and in a short space of time has won awards for being the Number One Half Marathon in the UK, Number One for Atmosphere as well as being in the top 10 Half Marathons of 2012.

Past winners 
Key:

References

External links
 Official website

Half marathons in the United Kingdom
Recurring sporting events established in 2012
Athletics in London
September sporting events